The Rome Marathon is an annual marathon competition hosted by the city of Rome, Italy.

History

The competition has also doubled as the Italian Marathon championships on two occasions; in 1983 and 1986. The race date was shifted from the traditional March schedule to 1 January in 2000 for a special edition of the event to celebrate the beginning of the new millennium. The IAAF Rome Millennium Marathon received the support of Primo Nebiolo and national federation president Gianni Gola. The race start point was at Saint Peter's Square and Pope John Paul II delivered a short benediction in approval of the event and the Bells of Saint Peter's replaced the usual starter's pistol to signal the beginning of the race.

The 2010 race was held in commemoration of the 50th anniversary of Abebe Bikila's win at the 1960 Rome Olympic marathon race, a watershed moment in the development of East African competitive running. The 2010 men's winner, Siraj Gena, earned a 5000€ bonus for crossing the finish line barefoot in honour of Abebe Bikila's style.

The 2020 edition of the race was cancelled due to the coronavirus outbreak, with all registration fees being applied for a guaranteed entry to the 2021 edition of the race, and all finishers to be awarded two medals in 2021.

Winners 

Key:
  Course record (in bold)
  Short course
  Italian championship race

Notes

References

List of winners
Città di Roma Marathon. Association of Road Racing Statisticians (2009-03-27). Retrieved on 2010-01-31.

External links
Official website

Marathons in Italy
Marathon
Recurring sporting events established in 1982
Spring (season) events in Italy
Athletics in Rome
1982 establishments in Italy